Decaturville may refer to the following places in the United States:

Decaturville, Missouri, an unincorporated community
Decaturville, Ohio, an unincorporated community
Decaturville, Tennessee, a town

See also
Decaturville crater, near Decaturville, Missouri